Paralovricia is a genus of ground beetles in the family Carabidae. This genus has a single species, Paralovricia beroni. It is found in Bulgaria.

References

Trechinae
Monotypic Carabidae genera